The Cheia is a small river in the Apuseni Mountains, Alba County, western Romania. It is a right tributary of the river Arieș. It flows through the villages of Ponor and Vale în Jos, and joins the Arieș near the village Sub Piatră.

References

Rivers of Romania
Rivers of Alba County